Payne Lake may refer to:
 Payne Lake (Alberta)
 Payne Lake (New York)
 Payne Lake (Quebec), the largest of these lakes